ST-2 is a telecommunications satellite made by Mitsubishi Electric. It was launched on May 20, 2011 atop an Ariane 5 ECA rocket from ESA's Guiana Space Centre in a dual-launch mission with GSAT-8. 
a
ST-2 is a replacement for the ST-1 satellite. It is built around the DS2000 spacecraft bus. It is in geosynchronous orbit at 88 deg. East, and is operated by the ST-2 Satellite Ventures joint company of Singapore Telecommunications(SingTel) and Chunghwa Telecom. It provides relay services over the Middle East, Central Asia, India and Southeast Asia.

References

External links

 http://www.arianespace.com/press-release/arianespace-launch-for-asia-and-india-st-2-and-gsat-8-satellites-in-orbit/
 https://web.archive.org/web/20120418171506/http://business.singtel.com/satellite/st2/about-st2.asp
 http://www.spacedaily.com/reports/Mitsubishi_Electric_Puts_ST2_Satellite_into_Orbit_999.html

Spacecraft launched in 2011
Communications satellites in geostationary orbit
Satellites using the DS2000 bus
Ariane commercial payloads
Singapore–Taiwan relations